Marquis de Lafayette is a monumental statue on the campus of Lafayette College in Easton, Pennsylvania. The statue, designed by Daniel Chester French and standing on a pedestal designed by Henry Bacon, was dedicated in 1921 in honor of the college's namesake, Gilbert du Motier, Marquis de Lafayette. The statue is located at the south entrance of Colton Chapel. It is one of a number of sculptures made by French for universities, which includes the statue of John Harvard at Harvard University and Alma Mater at Columbia University.

History

Background 
Daniel Chester French was an American sculptor active during the late 1800s and early 1900s who was well known for, among other things, his sculptures commemorating individuals from the American Revolutionary War. In 1885, he submitted an entry in a competition to design a statue of the Marquis de Lafayette in Washington, D.C., but his proposal was passed over in favor of a design by French sculptors Alexandre Falguière and Antonin Mercié. Years after the competition in 1917, French designed the Lafayette Memorial in Brooklyn's Prospect Park. During the designing of this statue, French had created a plaster mold of Lafayette, which he later donated to Lafayette College in Easton, Pennsylvania after hearing that the college was seeking to erect a statue of their namesake, Gilbert du Motier, Marquis de Lafayette. With the donation, the college arranged to have the mold cast in bronze and erected on their campus. According to a report by the National Park Service, the statue on Lafayette College's campus "probably most approximates French's competition entry for the Lafayette statue in Washington." An alumnus of the college convinced Morris L. Clothier (a member of The Pennsylvania Society) of Philadelphia to fund the casting and installation of the statue. On October 20, 1920, the college accepted the gift from Clothier, and that same year he was granted the honorary degree of Doctor of Laws for his contributions. The statue was cast at the Gorham foundry, while the pedestal was designed by architect Henry Bacon.

Dedication and recent history 
The statue was dedicated on the university's annual Founder's Day, on November 17, 1921. Notable attendees at the ceremony included Pennsylvania Governor William Cameron Sproul, Associate Justice William I. Schaffer of the Supreme Court of Pennsylvania (the ceremony's orator), Pennsylvania Attorney General George E. Alter, and Clothier as the special guest of honor. At the dedication ceremony, French was awarded the honorary degree of Legum Doctor (LL.D.) by the college.

In 2007, the statue and surrounding area underwent a significant renovation that saw the creation of a new plaza surrounding the monument. The plaza includes a fountain, benches, and flagstone patio. The renovations were part of the college's celebration of the 250th anniversary of Lafayette's birth.

Design 
Located at the south entrance of Colton Chapel, the statue faces southward. Marquis has a sword drawn in one hand, with an article in the magazine Architecture saying Lafayette is depicted as a "youthful soldier". The base of the monument is made of concrete and features the following quote from Lafayette inscribed on it: "I read, I study, I examine, I listen, I reflect and out of all this I try to form an idea into which I put as much common sense as I can."

See also 
 1921 in art
 Public sculptures by Daniel Chester French

References

Bibliography

External links 
 

1921 establishments in Pennsylvania
1921 sculptures
Bronze sculptures in Pennsylvania
Cultural depictions of Gilbert du Motier, Marquis de Lafayette
Easton, Pennsylvania
Lafayette College
Monuments and memorials in Pennsylvania
Outdoor sculptures in Pennsylvania
Sculptures by Daniel Chester French
Sculptures of men in Pennsylvania